The Murray Hong Kong was a government office building on 22 Cotton Tree Drive, Central, Hong Kong. It has 27 stories and housed some of the key decision making bureaus of the Hong Kong government.

The building was auctioned off for re-development into a hotel by the Lands Department in December 2011, after the government bureaus have moved to the Central Government Complex, Tamar.

The building has been re-purposed as a hotel The Murray and opened in 2018.

History
Located in a prime spot, Murray Building was designed by the then Public Works Department and completed in 1969. This 27-storey building was the tallest government building at that time.

Architectural interest
Murray Building was designed with its windows meticulously oriented to avoid intrusion of excessive direct sunlight. This design won the Certificate of Merit of the Energy Efficient Building Award in 1994. Another outstanding design feature of Murray Building, which is surrounded by major roads on all sides, is its vehicular entrance which is neatly knitted into the steep Cotton Tree Drive.

Future use

Murray Building became vacant upon relocation of its current offices to the new Central Government Complex at Tamar by end-2011. Given its prime Central location close to the Peak Tram Garden Road lower terminus and Hong Kong Park, coupled with the great demand for high-end hotels in the area, Murray Building has high potential to be converted into a hotel. With appropriate conversion and associated supporting facilities, the new hotel is expected to be a popular destination for visitors. Conversion is also an environmentally preferred option.

Sale controversy
In his policy address, Chief Executive Donald Tsang said the government will retain ownership of the 27-story building, built in 1969, even after it is converted into a 300-room hotel. But development officials on 2 March 2010 said the building, as well as its title-related rights, will be put up for tender next year, with the successful bidder given a 50-year ownership lease. Quizzed on the apparent about-face, officials said the latest proposal is "current policy." Central and Western District Council chairman Chan Tak-chor expressed outrage at the government's decision, taken without public consultation. 

Deputy Secretary for Development Gracie Foo Siu-wai admitted the deal will be a "land sale," with the ownership of Murray Building and the site passing to the successful bidder for 50 years. The winning developer will not be required to submit its master layout to the Town Planning Board for approval, she said. There are no plans for a special mechanism to monitor the maintenance of the building after the sale or any restriction on a further sale or transfer, she said.

But a SCMP/TNS survey found that most elite respondents backed a government proposal to lease the Murray Building to the private sector. Conducted from April19 to May3 2011, the SCMP/TNS poll interviewed 1,001 opinion leaders, including writers, businessmen, lobbyists and strategists. They were aged over 25 and came from households with monthly incomes of more than HK$40,000. Sixty-one per cent of respondents supported leasing the Murray Building to the private sector, with only 15 per cent against.

See also
 Murray Barracks

References

External links

 

Central, Hong Kong
Landmarks in Hong Kong
Hotels in Hong Kong
Office buildings completed in 1969